Micropterix ibericella is a species of moth belonging to the family Micropterigidae. It was described by Aristide Caradja in 1920. It is known from the Iberian Peninsula.

References

External links
Image

Micropterigidae
Moths described in 1920
Taxa named by Aristide Caradja